Dichomeris mulsa is a moth in the family Gelechiidae. It was described by Ronald W. Hodges in 1986. It is found in North America, where it has been recorded from Arizona. It is also found in Mexico.

The length of the forewings is about 8 mm.

References

Moths described in 1986
mulsa